The Ronde van het Groene Hart was a road bicycle race held in Groene Hart, Netherlands. The first edition of the race, in 2007, was organized as a 1.1 event on the UCI Europe Tour. The 203 km race started in Leiden and finished in Woerden, passing through Rotterdam, Amsterdam and Utrecht. The last edition of the race was in 2010; no sponsors could be found for 2011 or 2012 and the race was cancelled permanently.

Winners

External links
Official Website

UCI Europe Tour races
Cycle races in the Netherlands
Recurring sporting events established in 2007
2007 establishments in the Netherlands
Defunct cycling races in the Netherlands